The Queue was a nickname for the queue of mourners who waited to file past the coffin of Queen Elizabeth II while she lay in state at Westminster Hall in London, England, from 14 to 19 September 2022.

Two separate queues for mourners operated. There was also an accessible queue for people with disabilities or long-term health conditions.

The queues opened at 17:00 BST on 14 September.  The accessible queue was closed to new entrants at 16:33 on 17 September, and the main queue closed at 22:41 on 18 September.  The lying in state ended shortly after 06:30 on 19 September, in advance of Elizabeth II's state funeral later that day.  About 250,000 people were estimated to have waited in the queue.

The media and academics commented on the significance of the Queue as a symbol of the relationship of British people to their monarch, as a social phenomenon, and as reinforcement of the stereotype that British people enjoy queueing and are disciplined at doing so.

Precedents

Westminster Hall, the oldest existing part of the Palace of Westminster, was first used as the venue for a lying in state in 1898, for William Gladstone, and has since been used for the lyings-in-state of King Edward VII in 1910, King George V in 1936, King George VI in 1952, Queen Mary in 1953, Winston Churchill in 1965, and Queen Elizabeth The Queen Mother in 2002.
	
The queueing time for the Queen Mother's lying in state in 2002 reached approximately four hours; an estimated 200,000 people viewed her coffin.  At Winston Churchill's lying in state in 1965, the queue was approximately three hours long, and 321,360 people paid their respects.  The number of mourners in both cases was typical; 120,000 people viewed Queen Mary, 305,806 were recorded as having filed past King George VI, and approximately 250,000 people on each occasion viewed King George V, King Edward VII, and William Gladstone.

Routes

Main queue

A security checkpoint was located at the front of the main queue, before mourners entered Westminster Hall. Heading towards the rear end, the queue filled Victoria Tower Gardens, where barriers created a series of zig-zags. The main queue then crossed the River Thames at Lambeth Bridge, and followed the south bank of the Thames downstream. During the evening of 18 September, the back of the queue gradually moved westwards.

The main queue route passed more than 500 portable toilets, as well as eight first-aid stations, and multiple water stations.

Accessible queue
The accessible queue was a considerably shorter queue, available to individuals unable to stand for significant lengths of time, primarily intended for people with a disability or long-term health or medical condition.  This ran alongside Victoria Tower Gardens, with timed tickets picked up from a kiosk at Tate Britain on Millbank.  There were complaints that this queue was not sufficiently publicised or made clear, with some joining the main queue, and falling ill.  The accessible queue was closed on 17 September after reaching full capacity.

Length
The main queue began in the early morning of 14 September, and its growth continued throughout the day.  By 09:50 on 16 September, the Department for Digital, Culture, Media and Sport declared that the queue was at full capacity for the first time, and that entry would be paused for six hours.  When both the main and accessible queues reached maximum capacity and were temporarily closed, arriving mourners were directed to a "holding pen" in Southwark Park, referred to in one press headline as a "queue for the queue".

Organisation

Elizabeth II's lying in state was opened to the public at 17:00 BST on 14 September, following a service for the reception of her coffin after it was brought in procession from Buckingham Palace.  The lying in state was open for 24 hours a day, as were entry to both queues unless they were at capacity.  The accessible queue closed to new entrants at 16:33 on 17 September, and the main queue at 22:41 on the following day.  The lying in state itself ended at 06:30 BST on 19 September.

The planning for the queue was supported by crowd science advisor Keith Still and master's students at Manchester Metropolitan University, as part of the broader planning exercise for Elizabeth II's funeral.  The four days of lying in state at Westminster Hall were designated as Operation Marquee; the related logistical operations outside Westminster Hall, including management of the queue, as Operation Feather.

The live up-to-date position of the tail-end of the queue was publicised via the official website, using a what3words code. Officials later moved to an automated system to generate the identifiers, as manual transcription of the what3words codes had resulted in typos.

The Greater London Authority and the Department of Culture, Media and Sport (DCMS) coordinated operations, with on-the-ground assistance provided by nearly 800 paid stewards, supported by 100 civil service volunteers and hundreds of Scouts.  The DCMS provided live updates on the status of the queue on Twitter, Instagram, and YouTube, and queuers were issued coloured wristbands allowing them to temporarily leave the queue whilst not losing their place.  Participants were advised not to bring camping equipment or large bags.

Non-profit groups who assisted in the efforts included the British Red Cross, Samaritans, and Salvation Army, as well as St John Ambulance and First Aid Nursing Yeomanry.  Newspaper headlines announced that the Archbishop of Canterbury had sent pizzas to mourners in the queue, as his charity Feeding Britain delivered pizzas and hot drinks in the rain.  The Scouts collected unopened food abandoned at the security checkpoints at Westminster Hall to redistribute through the queue or donate to foodbanks.  Firefighters provided tea, coffee, and water, along with blankets to those struggling with the cold temperatures at night.  The London Ambulance Service placed 120 additional staff on duty in call centres and in public, and advised participants to wear appropriate clothing, in particular for the cold nights.

Exemptions from queuing
Members of Parliament and members of the House of Lords were permitted to attend the lying in state without needing to queue, and could each invite up to four guests.  Most Parliamentary staff could also avoid the queue and bring one guest.  The ability of these groups to skip the queue provoked criticism, as did the exclusion of certain workers, such as cleaners, security guards, and caterers, who are employed by contractors rather than directly by Parliament.

Participation and incidents

Early estimates reported that at least 250,000 people filed past Elizabeth II's coffin in Westminster Hall over the four days of the lying of state. The foot traffic resulted in the delamination of the Yorkstone floor.

The character of the queue was described as "subdued positivity".  People in the queue noted the bonding experience of being in the queue together, sharing details in deep conversation about personal lives, and the reasons why they were there.

King Charles III and William, Prince of Wales, visited the queue to speak to mourners on 17 September, and Justin Welby, Archbishop of Canterbury, was also present.

Some celebrities queued to take part in the lying in state, using both the public and parliamentary queues.  Those known to have joined the public queue included David Beckham, Kelly Holmes, Neil Jones, Sharon Osbourne, Susanna Reid, and Tim Vine.  Jason Kenney, the premier of the Canadian province of Alberta, flew to London at his own expense to view the lying in state.  Television presenters Phillip Schofield and Holly Willoughby were reported to have skipped the queue, causing some controversy, and leading ITV to explain that they were being escorted through the hall to film a segment for This Morning, without joining the filing mourners.

On 14 September, a 19-year-old man exposed himself and touched two women in the queue before jumping into the River Thames.  The man pleaded guilty to sexual assault.  Police were called to intervene when passers-by under the influence of alcohol began to heckle and disturb participants in the queue.  On 16 September, a 28-year-old man was arrested after he ran from the queue inside Westminster Hall and touched the coffin. He was charged under the Public Order Act but was found not fit to plead and sent to treatment at a mental health facility.

As of 16 September, the majority of medical incidents among participants in the queue were due to fainting, and resulting head injuries.  By 20 September, the London Ambulance Service reported that its staff and volunteers had provided medical support to an estimated 2,000 people in the queue, of whom 240 were taken for hospital treatment.

Some wristbands distributed to queuers were later listed on eBay; two used bands attracted a top bid of £436, and an unused one from 17 September received a bid of £2,000.  The majority of the listings of the wristbands were removed from the website due to its policy against the resale of event tickets.

Responses and media coverage

The main queue, often referred to as "The Queue", received extensive media coverage.  BBC News provided updates on progress and length, interviewing those waiting, and issuing breaking news alerts to inform the public of the queue's length.  Continuous live coverage of the queue was shown on BBC Parliament, and simultaneously livestreamed on the BBC News website and the BBC iPlayer.

The Evening Standard noted jokes and memes on social media that found humour in people queueing to join the queue, journalists queueing to interview people in the queue; as well as frustrations expressed at those who queue-jumped.  Vice described the queue as "an expression of respect", and the act of queueing as a concept making up part of the British national identity.  The queue was humorously termed the Elizabeth Line, a reference to the recently opened Elizabeth line, an underground railway line named after Elizabeth II.

The Times noted that the queue included a number of women participating in groups as a type of social event, drawing comparisons with brunch.  They also observed that the queue had drawn the attention of "crowd psychologists", consisting of researchers from the Universities of St Andrews, Edinburgh, Dundee, Sussex, and Keele, examining the behaviour of the crowds marking the death of Queen Elizabeth II and the accession of King Charles III.

The Daily Mirror reported on the accessible queue.  The article author "used the accessible route to view the Queen lying-in-state and, while it was well organised, still came across issues for those with a disability wanting to pay their respects".

According to Google Trends, 'How long is the queue now?' was the highest trending search in the United Kingdom throughout the week.  Appreciation for the queue on the internet became most apparent following a Twitter thread, which described the queue as "a triumph of Britishness".  A piece of short fiction by Will Dunn in the New Statesman imagined a future where the maintenance of the queue over decades led to profound changes in the structure of British society.

Guinness World Records confirmed they were assessing the scale of the queue and crowds, and whether it constitutes a global and historical record.  The British Film Institute (BFI) in South Bank displayed historical footage of mourners queueing to pay respects to George VI.

References

External links

Palace of Westminster
Death and state funeral of Elizabeth II
September 2022 events in the United Kingdom
Crowds
Queue management
2022 in London
History of the London Borough of Southwark
History of the London Borough of Lambeth